Zalduondo is a village and municipality located in the province of Araba (Álava), in the Basque Country (autonomous community), northern Spain. In 2012 the population was 185 persons and the extension of the village is 12,03 km².

References

External links
 ZALDUONDO in the Bernardo Estornés Lasa - Auñamendi Encyclopedia (Euskomedia Fundazioa) 

Municipalities in Álava